Andrea Clemente (6 July 1942 – 16 January 1970) was an Italian bobsledder. He competed in the four-man event at the 1968 Winter Olympics.

References

1942 births
1970 deaths
Italian male bobsledders
Olympic bobsledders of Italy
Bobsledders at the 1968 Winter Olympics